The 2018 WPI Engineers football team represented Worcester Polytechnic Institute in the 2018 NCAA Division III football season. It marked the Engineers' 129th overall season.  The team played its home games at Alumni Stadium in Worcester, Massachusetts. They were led by ninth-year head coach Chris Robertson.

The Engineers finished the regular season with its fourth consecutive winning season post a six victory and 4 loss record.

Personnel

Coaching staff

Schedule
The 2018 schedule was officially released on July 3, 2018. WPI faced all seven NEWMAC opponents: Catholic, Coast Guard, Maine Maritime, MIT, Merchant Marine, Norwich, and Springfield. They also played three non-conference games: Anna Maria of the Eastern Collegiate Football Conference (ECFC), Becker of the Commonwealth Coast Conference (CCC), and RPI of the Liberty League.

 On August 27, the Engineers placed second with one first place vote in the 2018 NEWMAC Preseason Coaches' Poll.

Awards and honors

Weekly awards
NEWMAC Football Offensive Athlete of the Week
Sean McAllen, RB – Week Ending September 16, 2018

NEWMAC Football Special Teams Athlete of the Week
Spencer Herrington, K/P – Week Ending September 2, 2018
Spencer Herrington, K/P – Week Ending November 11, 2018

New England Football Writers Association Weekly Gold Helmet Award
Sean McAllen, RB – Week of September 19, 2018

Postseason awards 
NEWMAC Special Teams Athlete of the Year
 Spencer Herrington, K/P
NEWMAC All-Conference First Team
 Sam Casey, DB
 Nick Day, OL
 Spencer Herrington, K/P
 Sean McAllen, RB
 Mike McGoff, DL
NEWMAC All Conference Second Team
 Lou Duh, DL
 Vince Lucca, OL
 Blayne Merchant, LB
 Nic Rossi, WR
 Collin Saunders, DB
NEWMAC All-Sportsmanship Team
 Larry Cafaro, LB
D3football.com All-East Region First Team
 Spencer Herrington, K/P
New England Football Writers Division II/III All‐New England Team
 Nick Day, OL
Google Cloud Academic All-District Football Team (DIII) by CoSIDA
 Nick Day, OL
 Lou Duh, DL
 Erik Fyrer, WR
 Spencer Herrington, K/P
 Nick Ostrowski, LB

References

WPI
WPI Engineers football seasons
WPI Engineers football